Kevin Simon Noteman (born 15 October 1969) is a footballer who played as a winger in the Football League for Leeds United, Doncaster Rovers, Mansfield Town and Chester City.

References

1969 births
Living people
Footballers from Preston, Lancashire
Association football wingers
English footballers
Leeds United F.C. players
Doncaster Rovers F.C. players
Mansfield Town F.C. players
Chester City F.C. players
Hibernians F.C. players
Ilkeston Town F.C. (1945) players
English Football League players
English expatriate footballers
Expatriate footballers in Malta